Zane Weir (born 7 September 1995) is an Italian of South African descent shot putter. He has represented Italy since February 2020, and competed for them at the 2020 Summer Olympics. He won gold at the 2023 European Athletics Indoor Championships.

Biography

Early and personal life
Weir was born and raised in Amanzimtoti, South Africa. He studied at Westville Boys' High School and the University of Cape Town. A South African with Italian heritage, Weir said it was his having listened to his grandfather Mario's sporting tales of his time in Italy, that made him decide to represent Italy after completing his degree in finance and accounting. His grandfather had been a keen sportsman.

Career

2021
He produced a personal best of 21.11 m in February 2021 – 1 cm over the qualifying mark to book his spot for the trip to Japan and the delayed 2020 Tokyo Olympics.

In May 2021, at the Diamond League Meeting in Doha he finished 5th.

In the delayed 2020 Olympic Games held in Tokyo in 2021, he placed 5th overall in the Qualification round on August 3, 2021, after finishing 3rd in group B with a personal best toss of 21.25. Two days later, he placed again 5th in the Olympic final, with a new PB of 21.41.

He produced another new personal best  on September 5, 2021, at the Meeting Città di Padova in Italy with a mark of 21.63 m, improving his personal best from Tokyo 2020 by 22 centimeters, improved again in Caorle on 19 September, to bring it to 21.66 m.

He improved his personal record on March 13, 2022 at the 2022 European Throwing Cup, in Leiria with a mark of 21.99 m, winning the competition.

2023: European Indoor champion
Weir broke the Italian indoor national record on the way to throwing 22.06 and winning gold at the 2023 European Athletics Indoor Championships in Istanbul, on March 3, 2023.

Achievements

See also
 Italian all-time lists - Shot put

References

External links
 

1995 births
Living people
South African male shot putters
Italian male shot putters
South African people of Italian descent
University of Cape Town alumni
People from Amanzimtoti
Athletes (track and field) at the 2020 Summer Olympics
Olympic athletes of Italy
Athletics competitors of Fiamme Gialle